The 2014 Australian Touring Car Masters Series was an Australian motor racing competition for modified Touring Cars manufactured between 1 January 1963 and 31 December 1976. It was sanctioned by the Confederation of Australian Motor Sport as a National Series with Australian Classic Touring (3D) Cars Pty Ltd appointed by CAMS as the Category Manager. It was the eighth annual Touring Car Masters series.	

The Pro Masters class was won by John Bowe (Ford Mustang), the Pro Am class by Mark King (Chevrolet Camaro RS) and the Pro Sports class by Chris Stillwell & Sven Burchartz (Ford Mustang).

Calendar

The series was conetested over seven rounds.

Classes and points system
Each competing automobile was classified into one of three classes, Pro Masters, Pro Am or Pro Sport.

Series points were awarded on the following basis within each class in each race:

For the Pro Sport class only, up to three drivers could be nominated to compete in a car during the Series. Only one driver was permitted to compete at each round, however each nominated driver received Series points awarded to that car for each round of the Series.

Series standings

Half points were awarded in race two at Mount Panorama, Bathurst due to 75% of race distance not being reached.

There are minor discrepancies between round points and the total points for some drivers in the quoted reference at touringcarmasters.com.au (e.g. for John Bowe). The above table reflects the points as published in that source.

References

Touring Car Masters
Touring Car Masters